The Big Sheep Mountains are located in the eastern area of the U.S. State of Montana in Prairie County, Montana. They are the easternmost mountains in Montana.  Nearby towns include Circle, Lindsay, and Glendive.

See also
 List of mountain ranges in Montana

References

Mountain ranges of Montana
Ranges of the Rocky Mountains
Landforms of Dawson County, Montana